Saint Francis Township is one of fifteen townships in Effingham County, Illinois, USA.  As of the 2010 census, its population was 1,213 and it contained 453 housing units.

Geography

Cities, towns, villages
 Montrose (southwest three-quarters)
 Teutopolis (east edge)

Major highways
  Interstate 70
  U.S. Route 40
  Illinois Route 33

Demographics

School districts
 Dieterich Community Unit School District 30
 Teutopolis Community Unit School District 50

Political districts
 Illinois' 19th congressional district
 State House District 109
 State Senate District 55

References
 
 United States Census Bureau 2007 TIGER/Line Shapefiles
 United States National Atlas

External links
 City-Data.com
 Illinois State Archives

Townships in Effingham County, Illinois
1860 establishments in Illinois
Populated places established in 1860
Townships in Illinois